"Ready, Willing, and Able" can refer to:

Ready, Willing, and Able (film), a 1937 movie
Ready, Willing, and Able (1937 song), a song by composer Richard Whiting and lyricist Johnny Mercer, introduced in the movie
Ready, Willing, and Able (1954 song), a song by Floyd Huddleston, Dick Gleason, and Al Rinker, popularized by Doris Day in the movie Young at Heart
"Ready, Willing and Able", a song by All Saints from Saints & Sinners
Ready, Willing and Able (album), 1995 album by Daron Norwood
"Ready, Willing, and Able" (Daron Norwood song), this album's title track, later released by Lari White on the album Don't Fence Me In